{{DISPLAYTITLE:Pi2 Gruis}}

π2 Gruis, Latinised as Pi2 Gruis, is a binary star system in the southern constellation of Grus. It is faintly visible to the naked eye as a yellow-white hued star with an apparent visual magnitude of 5.622.

The primary, component A, is an F-type star of uncertain luminosity class. Malaroda (1975) gave it a stellar classification of F3 III-IV, which would indicate an evolving subgiant/giant star hybrid spectrum, whereas Houk (1978) listed it as class F0 V, suggesting that it is an F-type main sequence star. It has been considered to be a chemically peculiar star, but this is now considered doubtful. It is 758 million years old with 1.4 times the mass of the Sun. The star is 1.9 times the Sun's radius and is radiating 7 times the luminosity of the Sun from its photosphere at an effective temperature of 6,788 K.

The companion is a magnitude 11.3 star at an angular separation of 4.6 arc seconds.

References

F-type stars
Binary stars
Grus (constellation)
Gruis, Pi2
212132
110506
8524
Durchmusterung objects